An annular solar eclipse occurred on September 16, 1792. A solar eclipse occurs when the Moon passes between Earth and the Sun, thereby totally or partly obscuring the image of the Sun for a viewer on Earth. An annular solar eclipse occurs when the Moon's apparent diameter is smaller than the Sun's, blocking most of the Sun's light and causing the Sun to look like an annulus (ring). An annular eclipse appears as a partial eclipse over a region of the Earth thousands of kilometres wide.

Description
The eclipse was visible in a small part of Northeast Brazil including Recife, almost the whole of Africa with the exception of the southernmost area, southern Europe, and parts of Asia with much of the west of the Middle East, South India, Southeast Asia and less than half of its southeast islands as well as parts of the Atlantic, the Indian Ocean and the coast of New Holland, Australia. It was part of solar saros 131.

The umbral portion was 93 km (58 mi) long and started over 30–40 miles (40–50 km) east of the island of Boa Vista, Cape Verde, it included northernmost Senegal with Sant-Louis, much of southern Agaouedj (now part of Mauritania), Mali (which had separate principalities at the time), such as Timbuktu and Gao, modern-day Niger, Wadai (now part of Chad), Darfur, areas that are now the South Sudan and Abyssinia what now comprises Ethiopia and Kenya and Somalia (then as Somaliland). The greatest occurred just over 2.5 miles (4 km) east of Lagbogol in present-day Wajir, Kenya at 1.3 N, 39.9 W at 9:13 UTC (12:13 local time) and lasted for over 3 minutes.

The eclipse showed up to 50% obscuration in Morocco including Marrakesh, Ottoman Algiers (now Algeria), Libya, Egypt and Yemen, Nubia, near the tip of the Horn of Africa and the Chagos Archipelago, and on the other side west of Cape Verde, near the island of São Tomé, the Congo including Katanga, Malawi, modern day Mozambique and southcentral Madagascar.  Areas that were in the rim of the eclipse included Cornwall, France (Normandy and Paris), Alsace, southern German states, most of Austria, Hungary, Transylvania, Ottoman Wallachia (now Romania), Turkey and Armenia, Persia, India (Orissa) and the middle of Siam (now Thailand) and on the other side Namacqualand (now Namibia) and Basutoland.

The eclipse started in West Africa and Brazil and ended at sunset in Borneo, Java and the coast of western Australia.

The subsolar marking was in Abyssinia (now in Kenya).

In parts of the world, the eclipse was not seen in some areas in areas that had monsoon rains mainly within the rim areas.

Weather conditions in some areas during the eclipse was unknown.  The weather conditions for a part of western Europe including France was mainly cloudy and rainy.  At the time, France was experiencing the French Revolution.

See also 
 List of solar eclipses in the 18th century

References

External links 
 Google interactive maps
 Solar eclipse data

1792 09 16
1792 in science
1792 09 16